Sienna (from , meaning "Siena earth") is an earth pigment containing iron oxide and manganese oxide.  In its natural state, it is yellowish brown and is called raw sienna.  When heated, it becomes a reddish brown and is called burnt sienna. It takes its name from the city-state of Siena, where it was produced during the Renaissance. Along with ochre and umber,  it was one of the first pigments to be used by humans, and is found in many cave paintings.  Since the Renaissance, it has been one of the brown pigments most widely used by artists.

The first recorded use of sienna as a color name in English was in 1760.

The normalized color coordinates for sienna are identical to kobe, first recorded as a color name in English in 1924.

Earth colors
Like the other earth colors, such as yellow ochre and umber, sienna is a clay containing iron oxide, called limonite, which in its natural state has a yellowish colour. In addition to iron oxide, natural or raw sienna  also contains about five percent of manganese oxide, which makes it darker than ochre. When heated, the iron oxide is dehydrated and turns partially to haematite, which gives it a reddish-brown colour. 
Sienna is lighter in shade than raw umber, which is also clay with iron oxide, but which has a higher content of manganese (5 to 20 percent)  which makes it greenish brown or dark brown. When heated, raw umber becomes burnt umber, a very dark brown.

History
The pigment sienna was known and used in its natural form by the ancient Romans. It was mined near Arcidosso (formerly under Sienese control, now in the province of Grosseto) on Monte Amiata in southern Tuscany. It was called terra rossa (red earth), terra gialla (yellow earth), or terra di Siena. During the Renaissance, widely-read painting technique author Giorgio Vasari made note of it under the name terra rossa. Along with umber and yellow ochre, sienna became one of the standard browns used by artists from the 16th to 19th centuries, including Caravaggio (1571-1610) and Rembrandt (1606-1669), who used all three earth colors in his palette.

By the 1940s, the traditional Italian sources were nearly exhausted. Much of today's sienna production is carried out in the Italian islands of Sardinia and Sicily, while other major deposits are found in the Appalachian Mountains, where it is often found alongside the region's iron deposits. It is also still produced in the French Ardennes, in the small town of Bonne Fontaine near Ecordal.

In the 20th century, pigments began to be produced using synthetic iron oxide rather than natural deposits. The labels on paint tubes indicate whether they contain natural or synthetic ingredients. PY-43 indicates natural raw sienna, while PR-102 indicates natural burnt sienna.

Variations

There is no single agreed standard for the colour of sienna, and the name is used today for a wide variety of hues and shades.  They vary by country and colour list,  and there are many proprietary variations offered by paint companies. The colour box at the top of the article shows one variation from the ISCC-NBS colour list.

Raw sienna

Raw sienna is a yellowish-brown natural earth pigment, composed primarily of iron oxide hydroxide. The box shows the colour of the pigment in its natural, or raw state. It contains a large quantity of iron oxide and a small quantity (about five percent) of manganese oxide.

This kind of pigment is known as yellow ochre, yellow earth, limonite, or terra gialla.  The pigment name for natural raw sienna from the Colour Index International, shown on the labels of oil paints,  is PY-43.

This box at right shows a variation of raw sienna from the Italian Ferrario 1919 colour list.

Burnt sienna

Burnt sienna contains a large proportion of anhydrous iron oxide.  It is made by heating raw sienna, which dehydrates the iron oxide, changing it  partially to haematite, giving it rich reddish-brown colour.

The pigment is also known as red earth, red ochre, and terra rossa. On the Colour Index International, the pigment is known as PR-102.

This version is from the Italian Ferrario 1919 colour list.

The first recorded use of burnt sienna as a colour name in English was in 1853.

Burnt sienna pigment (Maerz and Paul)

This variation of burnt sienna is from the Maerz and Paul "A Dictionary of Color" from 1930. It is considerably lighter than most other versions of burnt sienna. It was a mix of burnt orange and raw sienna.

Dark sienna (ISCC-NBS)

This infobox shows the colour dark sienna. This variation is from the ISCC-NBS colour list. A similar dark sienna paint was frequently used on Bob Ross's TV show, The Joy of Painting.

Sienna (X11 colour)

The web colour sienna is defined by the list of X11 colours used in web browsers and web design.

See also
 List of colours
 List of inorganic pigments

References

Iron oxide pigments
Shades of brown